A walking excavator or popularly spider excavator is a special type of all-terrain excavator. Like the regular excavator it consists of a boom, stick, bucket and cab on a rotating platform known as the "house". However, its house sits atop an undercarriage consisting of leg or arm-like extensions with or without wheels. All extensions can move in increments, hence the name walking excavator. This is different from an early 20th century dragline excavator where a set of feet plate are alternately lifted and lowered.

History
Most traditional excavators have tracks or wheels as undercarriage, limiting their usability on steep inclines, uneven terrain or inaccessible positions.

In 1966, Edwin Ernst Menzi (1897–1984) and Joseph Kaiser (1928–1993) together invented the walking excavator for work on mountain slopes. Subsequently, Kaiser AG, Schaanwald, Liechtenstein, and Menzi Muck AG, Kriessern, Switzerland, developed excavators separately.

Despite the advantages of the design, it failed to be widely used for a number of reasons, including the relatively small gain in mobility; the fact that most excavation is done in urban areas; and costliness, both of the electro-hydraulic controls and of maintenance.

The walking excavator is still not well known to the general public.

Today, only walking excavators and forest harvesters, such as the Ecolog forest harvester or the TimberPro tilt cab, are designed to move and work in mountains.

Economic success
In 2007, Kaiser AG, Schaanwald, Liechtenstein, realized a turnover of nearly 60 million Swiss francs.
In 2013, Menzi Muck AG had a turnover of 56.93 million Swiss francs.
In 2014, Kaiser AG had a turnover of 70 million Swiss francs.

Design
The walking excavator's main feature is the ability to move in a crab- or spider-like fashion and hence overcome any terrain obstacle. The undercarriage design varies widely from model to model and between specialized roles. The number of legs or wheels can also vary from three (Menzi Muck 5000T2) to four. The leg design can also vary from fixed to telescoping. Most walking excavators now have rotating or powered wheels, allowing them to roll or drive depending on the need.

Often the boom is also employed in moving, for example to overcome gaps that are wider than the reach of the excavator's legs.

See also
 Harvester (forestry)

References

Further reading

External links
 Kaiser AG website
 Menzi Muck AG website

Engineering vehicles
Excavators